Marco Antonio Barba López (born 10 November 1985 in Seville) is a Spanish racing driver and brother to Álvaro Barba.

Career

Formula Junior 1600
Barba began his racing career in 2003 in the Spanish Formula Junior 1600 series, taking a single podium and two pole positions to finish the year in 12th place. He stayed in the championship the following year, taking eight podiums, including six race wins to finish runner–up behind current GP2 Series driver Michael Herck.

Formula Three
In 2004, Barba made his debut in the Spanish Formula Three Championship, racing in the rounds at Valencia and Barcelona. The following year, he stepped up to the championship full-time with Campos Racing, competing in the Copa de España class for older generation Dallara chassis. He took nine class podiums, including two class wins, to finish third in the standings, with teammate Arturo Llobell winning the title. In the overall championship standings he finished in 10th place. He also contested two races in the Italian Formula Three Championship for Team Ghinzani. Despite only taking part in two races, he scored enough points to be classified 10th in the final standings.

In 2006 and 2007 he raced in the main class of the series, firstly with Campos Racing before moving on to the TEC Auto team. During this period, he secured 14 podium places, including four race wins, and finished as runner–up to teammate Máximo Cortés in the 2007 season, losing out on the title by just four points.

For 2010, Barba rejoined the series, which is now known as the European F3 Open Championship. Driving for Cedars Motorsport, he won the title at the penultimate round of the season in Jerez.

Formula Renault 3.5 Series
In September 2006, Barba made his debut in the Formula Renault 3.5 Series at Donington Park, driving for Jenzer Motorsport alongside his older brother Álvaro. He contested the final six races of the season but failed to score a point.

Barba graduated to the Formula Renault 3.5 Series full-time in 2008, racing for the Italian Draco Racing squad alongside fellow team newcomer Bertrand Baguette. Although he failed to take a podium place, he finished in the points in nine races and was classified 14th in the championship standings.

Barba remained with the team for the 2009 season, and along with Baguette earned Draco the team championship, with Baguette also winning the driver's championship. Barba ended up ninth overall, recording a best result of two second places, with both coming at the Hungaroring.

International GT Open
In July 2008, Barba teamed up with his brother Álvaro to race a Mosler MT900R in the International GT Open event held at the newly constructed Valencia Street Circuit.

GP3 Series
In July 2010, Barba made his debut in the GP3 Series at the Hungaroring, replacing the injured Simon Trummer at Jenzer Motorsport. After retiring from the feature race, he recovered to finish 19th in the sprint event.

Auto GP
In March 2011, it was announced that Barba would join the Auto GP championship, racing for his former Formula Three team Campos Racing.

Racing record

Career summary

† As he was a guest driver, Barba was ineligible to score points.

Complete Formula Renault 3.5 Series results
(key) (Races in bold indicate pole position) (Races in italics indicate fastest lap)

† Driver did not finish the race, but was classified as he completed more than 90% of the race distance.

Notes

References

External links
 Official site 
 Career details from Driver Database

1985 births
Living people
Sportspeople from Seville
Spanish racing drivers
Euroformula Open Championship drivers
Italian Formula Three Championship drivers
Spanish GP3 Series drivers
World Series Formula V8 3.5 drivers
Auto GP drivers
Draco Racing drivers
Jenzer Motorsport drivers
Campos Racing drivers